Jason Pohl (born July 1, 1981) is a chopper designer who works at Orange County Choppers. He is most commonly known for his workplace being the subject of the American TV series American Chopper.

History 
Pohl's initial plan was to join the U.S. Marine Corps after finishing high school, however, he was awarded the August Holland Scholarship and decided to attend the Illinois Institute of Art, where he earned a bachelor's degree in Fine Arts.

Career 
Pohl joined Orange County Choppers as Senior Designer in early 2004.  He started his career at Incredible Technologies, based in Arlington Heights, IL as an Artist/Animator of videogames, where he worked on a digital pinball prototype licensed by OCC and was responsible for the modelling and designing of all choppers featured in the game.  Upon completion of the project, Paul Teutul Sr. was so impressed with his work, he approached Pohl to join the team. Since joining OCC, Pohl finds the most challenging part of his job to be taking two dimensional conceptual drawings and modelling and reshaping them into fully functional three dimensional parts.

References

Living people
Motorcycle builders
American Chopper
1981 births